Krishna Kumar (born 12 June 1968) is an Indian actor and politician from Kerala who appears in Malayalam and Tamil films and television. He is also a former News Reader in Doordarshan and All India Radio. He is now a BJP national council member from Kerala.

Early life
Krishna Kumar was born as the younger of the two sons of Gopalakrishnan Nair and Retnamma at Thiruvananthapuram. Members in his family had the background of serving in Indian military, hence, Kumar was also preparing to join the force when he got the offer to work as a news presenter in Doordarshan. It was his neighbor, a senior official working in Doordarshan, who recognised him to have a photogenic face and offered him the job in the government-owned broadcasting company, Kumar accepted it and decided to move on to a career in media.

Career
He was working as a television news presenter in Doordarshan when he got his first acting offer. Seeing him, K. Balachander's son Kailasam offered him a role in a 13-episode serial produced for DD Malayalam. He played the role of actor Nedumudi Venu's son, in his acting debut. DD Malayalam was the only Malayalam channel at that time. When Asianet made their debut, they made a TV soap opera titled Sthree (1998 – 2000) initially starring Siddique and Vinaya Prasad, Kumar played a charlatan's role. When Siddique got a break in films and left the show, Kumar was made the new protagonist and it was a break for him with the show becoming a major success.

He was supposed to make his film debut in 1993 with Joshiy-directed Sainyam, in which he was to play a naval officer, but the scenes were removed from the film, not to disappoint him, Joshiy gave him a chance to dub for Vikram's character in the film. But he was ousted from the dubbing studio saying he did not possess a dubbing artists' card from their guild. Later he debuted with the 1994 Malayalam film Kashmeeram. After that he acted in several Malayalam films and TV serials. Later, he migrated to Tamil by acting in some TV serials. It helped him
get roles in Tamil films such as Billa II, Deivathirumagal, and Mugamoodi among others. It also helped him return to Malayalam.

Politics
Krishna Kumar officially joined the Bharatiya Janata Party in February 2021 and was the party's candidate from Thiruvananthapuram constituency for the 2021 Kerala Legislative Assembly election. He lost along with his other counterparts. On October 5, 2021, he was elected as a member to the BJP national council from Kerala.

Personal life
Krishna Kumar was a news presenter in Doordarshan and Sindhu was in college when they first met. They married on 12 December 1994 at Trivandrum Club in Thiruvananthapuram.

They have four daughters including Malayalam actresses Ahaana Krishna and Ishaani Krishna and influencers Diya Krishna and Hansika Krishna. Sindhu is an entrepreneur and runs an advertisement agency.

Filmography

Films

Television

References

External links
 
 

1968 births
Living people
Indian male film actors
Male actors in Tamil cinema
20th-century Indian male actors
Male actors from Thiruvananthapuram
Politicians from Thiruvananthapuram
Bharatiya Janata Party politicians from Kerala
Male actors in Malayalam cinema
21st-century Indian male actors
Indian male television actors
Male actors in Malayalam television